Dramatica may refer to:

Drama, from the Greek term Dramatikos
Dramatica (software), a novel writing software implementing the narrative theory of the same name
Dramatico, a record label founded by Mike Batt around 2003
"Dramatica", the 8th song on Vapor Transmission, 2000 album by the synth rock band Orgy
Encyclopedia Dramatica, a parody-themed wiki in the vein of Wikipedia

See also
Dramatic (disambiguation)